Phoenix is the sixth album by American singer-songwriter Dan Fogelberg, released in 1979 (see 1979 in music).

Track listing
All songs written by Daniel Fogelberg.

Personnel
 Dan Fogelberg – lead and backing vocals, acoustic and electric guitars, percussion (1, 9), Prophet 5, electric and acoustic pianos (4–7, 9), bass guitar (10), orchestral arrangements
 Kenneth A. Buttrey – percussion (3)
 Paul Harris – acoustic piano (2) 
 Jerry Hey – flugelhorn (8)
 Russ Kunkel – drums (5, 6), congas (7)
 Gayle Levant – harp (8)
 Marty Lewis – tambourine (5)
 Jody Linscott – conductor, congas (4)
 Andy Newmark – drums (2–4, 7, 9)
 Norbert Putnam – bass guitar (except on 10)
 Tom Scott – saxophone (7), lyricon (7)
 Sid Sharp – concertmaster
 Glen Spreen – orchestral arrangements
 Mike Utley – organ (2, 5)

Production
 Producers – Dan Fogelberg, Marty Lewis and Norbert Putnam.
 Engineers – Jeff Guercio and Marty Lewis
 Recorded at Northstar Studios (Boulder, CO.); Quadraphonic Sound Studios (Nashville, TN); Bayshore Recording Studios (Coconut Grove, FL); The Village Recorder (Los Angeles, CA); Record Plant (Sausalito, CA).
 Mixed by Marty Lewis at Quadraphonic Sound Studios.
 Mastered by Glenn Meadows at Masterfonics (Nashville, TN).
 Music Consultant (Track 5) – Joe Walsh
 Art Direction and Design – Kosh
 Cover – Dan Fogelberg
 Photography – Andy Katz
 Management – Front Line Management

Chart performance
Weekly Charts 

Year End Charts (1980) 

 Charting Singles – Billboard (North America)

References

Dan Fogelberg albums
Epic Records albums
1979 albums
Albums produced by Norbert Putnam